Sam-E may refer to:

Sam-e, an alternative name of the drug S-Adenosyl methionine
Sam-E (singer), Swedish singer of Tunisian descent, part of the Swedish duo Medina

See also 
Sam E. Jonah (born 1949), Ghanaian businessman